Russell Henry Watson (26 December 1892 – 15 November 1941) was an Australian amateur middle distance champion, an Australian rules footballer, who played with St Kilda in the Victorian Football League (VFL), and a District Cricketer with the St Kilda Cricket Club (where he also served as its Vice-President).

Family
The son of Thomas Watson (1866-1925), and Flora Henrietta Watson (1874-1950), née Dowell, Russell Henry Watson was born at Moonee Ponds on 26 December 1892. He was the elder brother of Olympic and Empire Games athlete Alfred Joseph Watson (1907-1992). He married Freda Mildred Akhurst (1897-1979) on 20 August 1918. He died in East Melbourne on 15 November 1941.

Athlete
"One of the greatest all-round athletes Australia has ever produced", Watson held titles in the mile, half-mile, and 440 hurdles.

Military service
He served in the Firat AIF in the 6th Australian Field Ambulance.

Notes

External links 

1892 births
1941 deaths
Australian rules footballers from Melbourne
St Kilda Football Club players
People educated at Melbourne Grammar School
People from Moonee Ponds, Victoria